The Old Garrard County Jail is a historic Italianate-style building in Lancaster, Kentucky that was added to the United States National Register of Historic Places in 1984.

It is a two-story four bay building.  It has been deemed a "Good example of Italianate style."

It was used as the county jail from 1873 to 1986.  The building is currently used as a museum known as the Garrard County Jail Museum. Visitors can view the cells, a display commemorating , and local historic and military memorabilia.

References

External links
Information about the Garrard County Jail Museum

National Register of Historic Places in Garrard County, Kentucky
Prison museums in the United States
Museums in Garrard County, Kentucky
History museums in Kentucky
Jails on the National Register of Historic Places in Kentucky
County government buildings in Kentucky
Lancaster, Kentucky
Government buildings completed in 1873
1873 establishments in Kentucky